Datil is a census-designated place in Catron County, New Mexico, United States. As of the 2010 census it had a population of 54. Located at the intersection of U.S. Route 60 and New Mexico State Road 12, Datil is on the edge of the Cibola National Forest. The Very Large Array is also nearby. Rock climbers are attracted to Datil because it holds the Enchanted Tower, a climbing hotspot.

History
Datil is named after the nearby Datil Mountains. The name of the mountains came in turn from the Spanish word dátil, meaning “date”; the name most likely resulted from the fruit-like appearance of the seedpods of local yucca species.

The town lay along the Magdalena Stock Driveway. The driveway, which had wells spaced every ten miles along its length, was used by ranchers during the late 19th to mid-20th century as they drove cattle from Springerville, Arizona, to the railroad at Magdalena. The Bureau of Land Management maintains a campsite, Datil Well Campground, at the location of one of the former wells.

Geography
Datil is located at the intersection of U.S. Route 60 and New Mexico State Road 12. To the east lie the San Agustin Plains, the Very Large Array, and the village of Magdalena.

To the southwest, several populated subdivisions are accessible from State Road 12. The state highway continues past the local landmark Horse Mountain, a 9490‐foot peak, and further through the small town Apache Creek until reaching the county seat of Reserve.

U.S. 60 travels westward from Datil, passing northwest through the Cibola National Forest and coming out the other side just outside Pie Town.

Demographics

Education
The school district is Quemado Schools.

The district operates Datil Elementary School, a two-room schoolhouse with multi-level classes. Secondary students attend a K-12 school called Quemado Elementary and High School.

Climate

See also

 List of census-designated places in New Mexico
 Datil Mountains, the namesake of the town.

References

External links

 Datil article and photo gallery Datil, New Mexico article

Census-designated places in Catron County, New Mexico
Census-designated places in New Mexico